The  is a skyscraper located in Maebashi, Gunma Prefecture, Japan. Construction of the 154-metre, 33-storey skyscraper was finished in 1999. It is the tallest  building in Gunma Prefecture.

External links

  

Government buildings completed in 1999
Government buildings in Japan
Buildings and structures in Gunma Prefecture
Skyscraper office buildings in Japan
1999 establishments in Japan
Maebashi